Great Storm may refer to:

 Great Storm of 1703
 Great Lakes Storm of 1913
 North Sea flood of 1953, also known as The Great Storm of 1953
 Ash Wednesday Storm of 1962, also known as The Great Atlantic Storm of 1962
 Great Storm of 1975 - Tornado outbreak and large blizzard in the United States
 Great Storm of 1987

In media
 The Great Storm (Home and Away), a set of episodes which broadcast during the 2011 season of Australian soap opera, Home and Away, in a special story arc.
 The Great Storm Is Over, a song by Bob Franke

See also 
European windstorm
Great Gale (disambiguation)